Ragnhild Jepsen (born in 1969) is a Norwegian priest. A provost in the Nidaros Cathedral, she was appointed bishop of the Diocese of Bjørgvin in February 2023, succeeding Halvor Nordhaug.

Jepsen was born in 1969, and grew up in Ål. Her bishop ordination is set to be on 16 April 2023.

References

1969 births
Living people
Bishops of Bjørgvin
Norwegian Lutheran bishops